The 2017–18 season was Portsmouth's 119th season of existence and their first back in League One following their promotion as champions last season. Along with competing in League One, the club participated in the FA Cup, EFL Cup and EFL Trophy. The season covers the period from 1 July 2017 to 30 June 2018.

Players

Squad details

Statistics

|-
!colspan=15|Player(s) out on loan:

|-
!colspan=15|Player(s) who left the club:

|}

Goals record

Disciplinary Record

Transfers

Transfers in

Total losses:  £0

Transfers out

Total gaining:  £0

Loans in

Loans out

Competitions

Friendlies
As of 22 June 2017, Portsmouth have announced five pre-season friendlies against Salisbury, Eastleigh,
Havant & Waterlooville, AFC Bournemouth and Crawley Town.

On 19 June 2017, A joint decision was made to cancel the scheduled friendly against Cardiff City as the clubs were drawn together in the first round of the EFL Cup.

League One

League table

Result summary

Results by matchday

Matches
On 21 June 2017, the league fixtures were announced.

FA Cup
On 16 October 2017, Portsmouth were drawn away to Luton Town in the first round.

EFL Cup
On 16 June 2017, Portsmouth were drawn away to Cardiff City in the first round.

EFL Trophy
On 12 July 2017, Portsmouth were drawn in Southern Group A against Charlton Athletic, Crawley Town and Fulham U23s. After winning the group stages, Portsmouth were drawn at home to Northampton Town in the second round. A third round trip to Stamford Bridge to face Chelsea U21s was next for Pompey.

References

Portsmouth
Portsmouth F.C. seasons